Politics, Religion and Her is the fourth studio album by American country music artist Sammy Kershaw. The album launched several charting singles and itself charted at number 115 on The Billboard 200, also peaking at number 17 on Top Country Albums. Charting songs included "Vidalia", "Meant to Be", "Fit to Be Tied Down", and the title track, which peaked on the Hot Country Singles & Tracks charts at numbers 10, 5, 29, and 28 respectively.

Critical reception
At the time of release, the album received a C+ review from Entertainment Weekly, which praised the singer for finding emotional depth on songs like "Little Bitty Crack in Her Heart" (which  Randy Travis would later record on his 1999 album A Man Ain't Made of Stone) and the title track, but criticized his "tired" covers of "Memphis" and "Chevy Van". Allmusic also found these two pop covers uninspired in nature, but said that the album had "a couple of powerful, soul-baring ballads." Country Standard Time reviewer Larry Stephens gave a more positive review, saying, "His voice can never be mistaken for anything but country while he makes the music come alive. This is an album that has no bad cuts."

Track listing

Personnel
Compiled from liner notes.

Musicians
Tracks 1-4, 7, 10, 11
 Eddie Bayers - drums (all tracks)
 Glen Duncan - fiddle (all tracks)
 Paul Franklin - steel guitar (all tracks), Dobro (track 7)
 Sammy Kershaw - lead vocals (all tracks)
 Brent Mason - electric guitar (all tracks)
 Hargus "Pig" Robbins - piano (all tracks)
 John Wesley Ryles - background vocals (all tracks)
 John D. Willis - acoustic guitar (all tracks)
 Glenn Worf - bass guitar (all tracks)

Tracks 5, 6, 8, 9, 12
 Harold Bradley - tic-tac bass (track 12)
 Sonny Garrish - steel guitar (track 5, 8)
 Stuart Duncan - fiddle (track 8)
 Rob Hajacos - fiddle (track 6, 8, 9)
 John Hobbs - piano (tracks 5, 6, 8, 9)
 Sammy Kershaw - lead vocals (all tracks)
 Paul Leim - drums (all tracks)
 Nashville String Machine - strings (tracks 6, 9)
 Steve Nathan - organ (track 9), piano (track 12)
 Danny Parks - acoustic guitar (all tracks)
 Larry Paxton - bass guitar (all tracks)
 Hal Rugg - steel guitar (tracks 6, 9)
 John Wesley Ryles - background vocals (all tracks)
 Dennis Wilson - background vocals (all tracks)
 Reggie Young - electric guitar (all tracks)

Technical
 Bob Bullock - recording
 Buddy Cannon and Norro Wilson - production (tracks 5, 6, 8, 9, 12)
 John Kelton - mixing, recording
 Warren Peterson - string recording
 Keith Stegall - production (tracks 1-4, 7, 10, 11) 
 Ronnie Thomas - digital editing
 Hank Williams - mastering

Charts

Weekly charts

Year-end charts

Singles

References

1996 albums
Mercury Nashville albums
Sammy Kershaw albums
Albums produced by Buddy Cannon
Albums produced by Norro Wilson
Albums produced by Keith Stegall